Cox’s Bazar–Teknaf Marine Drive is an 80-kilometre-long road from Cox’s Bazar to Teknaf along the Bay of Bengal and it is the world’s longest marine drive. It was inaugurated on 6 May 2017, by Prime Minister Sheikh Hasina.

Details
It was constructed by 16th Engineer Construction Battalion of Bangladesh Army, under the supervision of Bangladesh Roads and Highways Department. The construction cost was around ৳1,050 crore (one thousand and fifty crore taka or ten billion and five-hundred million taka) i.e. US$120 million.

Gallery

See also
 Cox's Bazar Beach

References 

Tourist attractions in Chittagong Division
Cox's Bazar District
Marine drive
Waterfronts